Öznur Cüre (born 1 October 1997) is a Turkish Paralympian archer competing in the Women's compound bow W2 event.
She is competing at the 2020 Summer Paralympics in the Individual compound open and Mixed team compound events.

She won the silver medal with her teammate Bülent Korkmaz in the Mixed team compound event at the 2020 Summer Paralympics .

At the 2022 World Para Archery Championships in Dubai, United Arab Emirates, she won the gold medal in the Compound Women Open Doubles event together with her teammate Sevgi Yorulmaz.

References

1997 births
Living people
Turkish female archers
Paralympic archers of Turkey
Wheelchair category Paralympic competitors
Archers at the 2020 Summer Paralympics
Paralympic silver medalists for Turkey
Medalists at the 2020 Summer Paralympics
Paralympic medalists in archery
21st-century Turkish sportswomen
Islamic Solidarity Games medalists in archery